An executioners cemetery is a detached cemetery or separate little burial ground, where the executioners during the Ottoman Era were buried. There are two known executioner graves. One of them is around Eğrikapı, whereas the other one is around the Karyağdı Hill right beside the Eyüp Cemetery. Executioners have their own burial site because they were not allowed to be buried in public cemeteries, and they were laid to rest in only two graveyards in Istanbul, Turkey, and only secretly at night. Their headstones were left blank without any name or date for the purpose of avoiding any retaliation of the families of the executed people. Unfortunately, only a few executioner graves survived up to date.

References

Cemeteries in Istanbul
Sunni cemeteries
Eyüp
Golden Horn